Saturday is a day of the week.

Saturday may also refer to:

Film and television 
 Saturday (film), a 1945 Czechoslovak film
 "Saturday" (Roseanne), a 1989 television episode
 Saturdays (TV series), a 2023 Disney Channel series

Literature 
 Saturday (novel), 2005, by Ian McEwan 
 The Saturdays (novel), 1941, by Elizabeth Enright

Music 
 Saturday (opera) (German: Samstag), by Karlheinz Stockhausen
 The Saturdays, a British-Irish girl group
 Saturday (group), a South Korean girl group

Albums 
 Saturday (Ocean Colour Scene album), 2010
 Saturday (The Reivers album) or the title song, 1987

Songs 
 "Saturday" (Basshunter song), 2010
 "Saturday" (The Enemy song), 2012
 "Saturday" (Fall Out Boy song), 2003
 "Saturday" (Rebecca Black and Dave Days song), 2013
 "Saturday" (Twenty One Pilots song), 2021
 "Saturday" (Yo La Tengo song), 2000
 "Saturday (Oooh! Ooooh!)", by Ludacris, 2002
 "Saturday", by Baboon from their 2006 self-titled album
 "Saturday", by Babyface from For the Cool in You, 1993
 "Saturday", by Built to Spill from You in Reverse, 2006
 "Saturday", by the Carpenters from Carpenters, 1971
 "Saturday", by Childish Gambino and Deni's Band from the soundtrack of the film Guava Island, 2019
 "Saturday", by Christie Front Drive from Christie Front Drive, 1997
 "Saturday", by the Clientele from Suburban Light, 2000
 "Saturday", by Hedley from Hedley, 2005
 "Saturday", by the Judybats from Down in the Shacks Where the Satellite Dishes Grow, 1992
 "Saturday", by Kids in Glass Houses from Smart Casual, 2008
 "Saturday", by Liberty X from Thinking It Over, 2002
 "Saturday", by Marc Broussard from Carencro, 2004
 "Saturday", by Nathan Willett from the soundtrack of the film Captain Underpants: The First Epic Movie, 2017
 "Saturday", by Norma Jean Wright from Norma Jean, 1978
 "Saturday", by Per Gessle from The World According to Gessle, 1997
 "Saturday", by the Rocket Summer from Calendar Days, 2003
 "Saturday", by Sam Fender from Hypersonic Missiles, 2019
 "Saturday", by Simple Plan, 2015
 "Saturday", by Smile Empty Soul from Anxiety, 2005
 "Saturday", by Sparklehorse from Vivadixiesubmarinetransmissionplot, 1995
 "Saturday", by White Reaper from You Deserve Love, 2019
 "Saturday (Do I Care)", by Jack Lucien from EuroSceptic, 2009
 "Saturdays", by Chevelle from Vena Sera, 2007
 "Saturdays", by Twin Shadow from Caer, 2018

People 
 Jeff Saturday (born 1975), American football player
 Windradyne or Saturday (c. 1800-1829), Australian Aboriginal warrior and resistance leader

See also 
 "A Roller Skating Jam Named "Saturdays"", a song by De La Soul
 Saturday morning (disambiguation)
 Saturday Night (disambiguation)